The 2015 NAIA men's soccer season is the 57th season of NAIA Championship college soccer. The regular season began in September, 2015 and concluded on December 5, 2015 with the National Championships, held in Delray Beach, Florida. The defending champions are Davenport (MI).

Changes from 2014

Conference Realignment

Season Overview

Polls
Ratings for NAIA as of December 9, 2015

Received Votes
The following teams, ranked 26-37, received votes for the Top 25: WVU Tech; Ashford (Iowa); Bethel (Tenn.); The Master's (CA); Thomas (GA); Great Falls (MT); Bryan (TN.); Mobile (AL); UC Merced; Concordia (NE); St. Thomas (TX); Grace (IN.).

Standings
2015 NAIA men's soccer standings as of December 9, 2015

American Midwest Conference

(C) Conference Champion; (T) Conference Tournament Champion

Appalachian Athletic Conference

(C) Conference Champion; (T) Conference Tournament Champion

California Pacific Conference

(C) Conference Champion; (T) Conference Tournament Champion

-Antelope Valley where not allowed a play-off bid due to first year eligibility.

Cascade Collegiate Conference

(C) Conference Champion; (T) Conference Tournament Champion

Chicagoland Collegiate Athletic Conference

(C) Conference Champion; (T) Conference Tournament Champion

References 

2015 in American soccer